Umbrella octopuses (family Opisthoteuthidae) are a group of pelagic octopuses.  Umbrella octopuses are characterized by a web of skin between the arms, causing them to somewhat resemble an opened umbrella when the arms are spread.

Description 
Opisthoteuthidae are a group of octopuses characterized by a web of skin in between their arms. They have a U or W shaped shell that holds the mantle and connects to their arms at the bottom. This structure makes the umbrella octopus resemble an umbrella when they spread their arms/web out. The structure of the umbrella octopus has the oral surface below the mantle of the octopuses and the web with their arms surround the bottom of the mantle. Their outer skin has a very delicate consistency that results in white spots appearing on their skin when damaged. Opisthoteuthidae fall into the cirrate octopod group, meaning they have fins. Although opisthoteuthidae are categorized as cirrates, unlike the other cirrates, they do not have an intermediate web; rather, they use the web in between their arms to mimic the intermediate web that other cirrates have. Lacking an intermediate web is what causes the indentations in the outer edge of their arms that make them look like an umbrella.

Behavior

Defense mechanisms 
Opisthoteuthidae lack an intermediate web but they mimic the defensive mechanism of ballooning by extending the web between their arms as much as possible and curving the outer edges of their arms inwards in order to have the edges touch the ground. They also extend their fins parallel to the floor to help keep their balance or they curve them around their mantle. Opisthoteuthidae have been observed to hold this position for five and a half minutes. Another defensive mechanism that Opisthoteuthidae have been observed using is web-inversion which is when they have their arms turned upwards and their web with the oral surface facing outwards. The oral surface can be facing the floor, or the octopuses may lie laterally so their side is in contact with the floor. It has been noted that these defensive behaviors are the positions the octopuses may go into while feeding as well, but it is possible that this could be because of the stress of being captured and placed in an aquarium to be observed.

Resting behavior 
When resting at the floor, the octopus's behavior falls into one of two tactics: bottom-resting or flat-spreading. Bottom-resting is when the octopus is resting near the floor. It will erect its mantle, curve the outer edges of its arms inwards to have them be the only part making contact with the floor. The fins are extended out parallel to the bottom to maintain balance. When flat-spreading they spread their arms and web, so it is parallel to the bottom and they keep the edges of their arms curved inwards. Their heads will point backwards at a small angle and their fins will be used for stabilization.

Dispersion 
Opisthoteuthidae are deep sea creatures that have been found in the Clipperton-Clarion Fracture Zone in the Pacific Ocean at a depth of about 4,800 m. They have also been found in the South China Sea. They stay within 3,000-4,000 meters below sea level and try to stay hovering over the ocean floor.

Taxonomy
Genus Cryptoteuthis
Cryptoteuthis brevibracchiata
Genus Grimpoteuthis
Grimpoteuthis abyssicola, red jellyhead
Grimpoteuthis angularis, angle-shelled dumbo octopus
Grimpoteuthis bathynectes, Dumbo octopus
Grimpoteuthis challengeri
Grimpoteuthis discoveryi
Grimpoteuthis greeni, Green's dumbo octopus
Grimpoteuthis hippocrepium
Grimpoteuthis imperator, emperor dumbo octopus
Grimpoteuthis innominata, small jellyhead
Grimpoteuthis meangensis
Grimpoteuthis megaptera
Grimpoteuthis pacifica
Grimpoteuthis plena
Grimpoteuthis tuftsi
Grimpoteuthis umbellata
Grimpoteuthis wuelkeri – possibly same as G. umbellata or G. plena
Genus Luteuthis
Luteuthis dentatus, Lu's jellyhead
Luteuthis shuishi
Genus Opisthoteuthis 
Opisthoteuthis agassizii Verrill, 1883
Opisthoteuthis albatrossi (Sasaki, 1920)
Opisthoteuthis borealis Collins, 2005
Opisthoteuthis bruuni (Voss, 1982)
Opisthoteuthis californiana Berry, 1949
Opisthoteuthis calypso Villanueva, Collins, Sánchez & Voss, 2002
Opisthoteuthis chathamensis O'Shea, 1999
Opisthoteuthis depressa Ijima & Ikeda, 1895
Opisthoteuthis dongshaensis C. C. Lu, 2010
Opisthoteuthis extensa Thiele, 1915
Opisthoteuthis grimaldii (Joubin, 1903)
Opisthoteuthis hardyi Villanueva, Collins, Sánchez & Voss, 2002
Opisthoteuthis japonica Taki, 1962
Opisthoteuthis massyae (Grimpe, 1920)
Opisthoteuthis medusoides Thiele, 1915
Opisthoteuthis mero O'Shea, 1999
Opisthoteuthis persephone Berry, 1918
Opisthoteuthis philipii Oommen, 1976
Opisthoteuthis pluto Berry, 1918
Opisthoteuthis robsoni O'Shea, 1999

References

External links
Tree of Life website gives information about the classification of cephalopod groups

Octopuses